The Lambeth Lancers were a Junior ice hockey team based in Lambeth, Ontario, Canada.  They played in the Provincial Junior Hockey League of the Ontario Hockey Association.

History

The Lambeth Lancers were founded in 1987 as members of the Western Ontario Junior D Hockey League. The Lancers were created in the tradition of the Lambeth Flyers who were members of the same league from 1968 until 1975.

In the 1988 playoffs, the Lancers won the Western league title in their first season. They challenged the Exeter Hawks of the Southern Counties Junior D Hockey League in the final and defeated them 4-games-to-2 to win their first ever OHA Cup.

The next season, the Western and Southern Counties leagues merged to create a "super league". The Lancers won the league's championship by defeating the Lucan Irish 4-games-to-none to win their second straight OHA Cup.

In 1991, the Western Junior D league became the OHA Junior Development League.

In 2000, the Lambeth Lancers ceased operations due to financial problems. The team was put on the shelf and their rights were put on sale. After a year of waiting, the team was bought and resurrected by the Western Ontario Hockey League's London Nationals who were looking for a farm team.

2001 saw the resurrection and the Lancers and them making the playoffs in their first year, thanks to the likes of an offensive prowess in Jay Mocszelt and Josh Ryan who came over from the Port Stanley Lakers club. Mike Borrows and his brother Jeff (15 at the time) and a collection of other young talent being groomed for a transition to the Jr. B London Nationals team. Coach Dan Dolbear led the team during these years with few players that moved on to bigger and better things.  Standouts included defenseman Brad Meagher, who led all defencemen in the league in points in his rookie season and logged a considerable amount of ice-time for the team. He went on to acquire the best defenseman trophy in the Yeck conference each year he played as well as leading defenseman scoring in those years. Jeff Borrows (5'8") went on to play Jr. B and then on to semi-pro in the US. Mike Borrows went on to become the GM of the London Nationals from 2013-2016, winning 2 Western Conference Championships and a Sutherland Cup. Notable team matchups during the 2001-2005 era were the Thamesford Trojans, Exeter Hawks, Mount Brydges Bulldogs and West Lorne (and former Port Stanley) Lakers.

The 2005-06 season saw the Lancers finish in ninth place overall. They entered the conference quarter-final against the North Middlesex Stars and were defeated 4-games-to-1.

The 2006–07 season ended with the Lancers finishing in fifth place overall in the league. The OHAJDL disbanded at the end of the 2005–06 season and was replaced by the Southern Ontario Junior Hockey League. In the first round of the playoffs, the Lancers drew the Mount Brydges Bulldogs. The Lancers defeated the Bulldogs 4-games-to-1 to advance to the conference semi-final. The second round of the playoffs pitted the Lancers against the red-hot Mitchell Hawks. The Hawks swept the Lancers 4-games-to-none and eventually went on to win the OHA Cup as SOJHL champions.

The 2010–2011 season was one of the worst in Lancers history. The Lancers ended the season with 16 winless games, two losses coming in overtime. The Lancers weren't expected to make any impact during the SOJHL playoffs. However, when facing the 2nd-place Exeter Hawks in the first round, the Lancers took part of SOJHL history by defeating the Hawks in 6 games in what would go down as one of the biggest upsets in the SOJHL playoffs. The "puck stopped there" as the Lancers went on to face the eventual OHA Jr. D champions, Thamseford Trojans, dropping 4 straight in the Conference Semi-final.

Season-by-season standings

External links
Lancer's Homepage

Southern Ontario Junior Hockey League teams